Chahbounia District is a district of Médéa Province, Algeria.

The district is further divided into 3 municipalities:
Chahbounia
Boughezoul
Bou Aiche

Districts of Médéa Province